The Athenian Letters was a collaborative work of Ancient Greek history and geography, published by a circle of authors around Charles Yorke and Philip Yorke, and taking the form of commentary in letter form on Thucidydes. It had a “considerable vogue”.

Others involved, anonymously, were Thomas Birch, Henry Coventry,  John Green, Samuel Salter, Catherine Talbot, Daniel Wray, George Henry Rooke, John Heaton, John Lawry, and William Heberden. The authorship was for a long time a well-guarded secret. A one-volume edition in 1781 ran to 100 copies, the first edition having been only of 10, and later editions and a French translation followed.

Notes and references

1741 books
18th-century history books
History books about ancient Greece